The Carl D. Perkins Bridge is a cantilever bridge that spans the Ohio River between Washington Township, Scioto County, Ohio and South Portsmouth, Greenup County, Kentucky.  The bridge carries the two lanes of State Route 852 and Truck Route U.S. Highway 23.  The bridge connects to Kentucky Route 8.

History
In July 1978, inspections of the original U.S. Grant Bridge found serious deterioration in its suspension cables. The bridge was closed to traffic and was rehabilitated over an 18-month period. With future traffic projected to increase compounded with a decline in level of service on the original U.S. Grant Bridge, the Kentucky Department of Transportation (KYDOT) and the Ohio Department of Transportation (ODOT) agreed to begin planning for a new bridge. The 1978 Surface Transportation Assistance Act authorized the construction of a new bridge across the Ohio River in Portsmouth.

The bridge opened on January 28, 1988. It is named after the late Carl D. Perkins, Congressman from the 7th District of Kentucky.

During the demolition of the original U.S. Grant Bridge and the construction of its replacement upstream, it was the only highway bridge connecting Ohio to Kentucky at Portsmouth. The Perkins Bridge also served as a detour for U.S. Highway 23 during this time period.

See also

 List of crossings of the Ohio River

References

External links

Carl Perkins Bridge at Bridges & Tunnels

Bridges completed in 1988
Bridges over the Ohio River
Bridges in Greenup County, Kentucky
Transportation in Scioto County, Ohio
Buildings and structures in Scioto County, Ohio
Road bridges in Kentucky
Road bridges in Ohio
U.S. Route 23
Bridges of the United States Numbered Highway System
Cantilever bridges in the United States